Behind Two Guns is a 1924 American silent Western film, directed by Robert North Bradbury. It stars J. B. Warner, Hazel Newman, and Marin Sais, and was released on May 15, 1924.

Plot 
Dr. Elijah Cutter (J.B. Warner) and his Indian assistant Eagle Slowfoot (Guillermo Calles) are called upon to investigate a series of stagecoach robberies.  The stages arrive at their destination never having been held up, but when the locked cashbox is opened, all of the money is missing.

Dr. Betz (Otto Lederer) is a hypnotist.  He has been hypnotizing Myrtle Baxter (Marin Sais) and using her to commit the crimes.  Jessie Nash (Hazel Newman) asks Cutter to help prove that her grandfather, who is accused of the crime, is innocent.

Cutter watches from afar to determine how the money is being taken, and he and Eagle Slowfoot set out to capture the perpetrators.  Betz is killed during the ensuing struggle.

Cast

Production 
Behind Two Guns is one of the few surviving films to prominently feature Guillermo Calles.  He wears pasty makeup and long braids, and performs a stereotypical Indian dance wearing a feathered outfit.

References

External links 
 
 
 

1924 Western (genre) films
1924 films
American black-and-white films
Silent American Western (genre) films
1920s American films